Kamar Sabz or Kamar-e Sabz may refer to:
 Kamar Sabz, Razavi Khorasan
 Kamar Sabz, South Khorasan
 Kamar Sabz (mountain)